Dulehar is an approximately 600- to 700-year-old village situated in the foothills of the Himalayas, more specifically, Sivalik Hills of Himachal Pradesh, India. Primarily a Doad Rajput settlement (which is unique because it has separate localities for every caste) It has four entry and exit roads which meet at a central location called Chaupal and has its own Thakur Dwara (Lord Krishna Temple). The majority of the population work in agriculture.

There are also number of Joshi families in this village believed to be originally from Maharashtra, who came to fight the invader Ahmad Shah Durrani in  the Battle of Panipat (1761).

Mandir of BABA GOSAIN DAYAL is also situated in village dulehar in the midst of village, name "choukhandi"
There are so many mandirs in the village related to religion of the people

Villages in Una district